Blastobasis intrepida is a moth in the family Blastobasidae. It was described by Edward Meyrick in 1911. It is found on the Seychelles.

References

Blastobasis
Moths described in 1911